Pixie Hollow Games is a 30-minute television special broadcast on November 19, 2011, on Disney Channel. Based on the Disney Fairies franchise, it was produced by DisneyToon Studios and animated by Prana Studios. It features the voices of Mae Whitman, Lucy Liu, Raven-Symoné, Megan Hilty, Angela Bartys, and others, as Tinker Bell and the other fairies of Pixie Hollow in Never Land, taking part in an Olympic-style competition. It is based loosely on J. M. Barrie's Peter Pan stories, by way of Disney's animated adaptation.

It was originally intended as the last of five feature-length films in the Tinker Bell series of direct-to-DVD 3D animated films, with the title Tinker Bell: Race through the Seasons, and a release date in 2012. However, the movie was rescheduled and retooled as a TV special instead of a film-length movie. Unlike the previous feature films in this series, Tinker Bell is not a central featured character in this special release.

Plot

Rosetta is busy helping to set up flowers for the big night when she meets a new garden fairy named Chloe. Chloe announces she has been training for the Pixie Hollow Games and is excited to be competing. Even though the garden fairies have little hope of winning and haven't ever won, Chloe is confident that she and her partner can turn things around and end their losing streak. When it comes time for the team selection, Chloe has already volunteered and Rosetta is selected to be her partner.

On the night of the games, Rosetta wears a fancy gown, certain that she and Chloe will be eliminated after one round. The storm fairies, Rumble and Glimmer, are the heavy favorites to win the competition due to their winning streak and having winners' rings for almost every finger. The first event is leapfrogging. Rosetta refuses to get onto the frog but finally does when the spectators yell in protest, leading to total chaos on the racetrack.

The next day, Rosetta and Chloe continue to compete in a series of games, such as dragonfly water skiing, twig-spheres, and mouse polo, slowly moving up in the standings during each game. The final challenge (a teacup race) arrives. Chloe dives down the chute with no trouble, but Rosetta nervously crawls down the chute, to Chloe's dismay. Rosetta's actions put them in last place, causing Chloe to start doubting her. Meanwhile, other teams start dropping which leaves only the garden and storm fairies.

Rosetta and Chloe take the mudslide mountain shortcut and successfully make it over thanks to Tinker Bell. However, in the last leg of the race, Rumble uses Glimmer's lightning ability to zap one of the wheels causing the girls' cart to crash. Glimmer is appalled. Seeing their cart destroyed, Rosetta and Chloe push their cart over the finish line and finish together. While Rumble celebrates his victory, Queen Clarion announces that the garden fairies are the winners. Rumble protests, until she shows him that Glimmer abandoned him just before the finish line for cheating, giving the victory to the garden fairies. Rosetta and Chloe broke their losing streak and they celebrate with their friends.

Cast
 Megan Hilty as Rosetta, a garden fairy and the main protagonist of the film
 Brenda Song as Chloe, a new garden fairy and Rosetta's partner
 Jason Dolley as Rumble, a storm fairy and the main antagonist of the film
 Tiffany Thornton as Glimmer, a storm fairy and Rumble's partner
 Zendaya as Fern, a garden fairy
 Mae Whitman as Tinker Bell, a tinker fairy
 Lucy Liu as Silvermist, a water fairy
 Raven-Symoné as Iridessa, a light fairy
 Angela Bartys as Fawn, an animal fairy
 Pamela Adlon as Vidia, a fast-flying fairy
 Jeff Bennett as Clank, a large tinker fairy with a booming voice / Fairy Gary, the overseer of the pixie-dust keepers and Terence's partner
 Rob Paulsen as Bobble, a wispy tinker fairy with large glasses / Buck, a new animal fairy and Fawn's partner
 Jane Horrocks as Fairy Mary, the overseer of the tinker fairies and Tink's partner
 Jessica DiCicco as Lilac, a garden fairy / Lumina, a new light fairy and Iridessa's partner
 Kari Wahlgren as Ivy, a garden fairy
 Alicyn Packard as	Zephyr, a new fast-flying fairy and Vidia's partner
 Jesse McCartney as Terence, the pixie-dust keeper
 Dan Curtis Lee as Starter Sparrowman
 Kraisit Agnew as Tabby
 Anjelica Huston as Queen Clarion, the queen of all Pixie Hollow

Music
The score to the special is composed by Joel McNeely, who scored the first three Tinker Bell films. Zendaya sings the theme song (written by Brendan Milburn and Valerie Vigoda of GrooveLily), which is called "Dig Down Deeper".
Zendaya performed "Dig Down Deeper" in the 2011 Macy's Thanksgiving Day Parade.
In Spain, the main theme was played by Lydia Fairen.

Release
The special debuted in the United States on The Disney Channel on November 19, 2011.

The special was included as a bonus feature on the Blu-ray releases of Secret of the Wings in 2012.   A standalone DVD was released on August 20, 2013.

Sequel

A fourth full-length Tinker Bell film, Secret of the Wings, was originally announced to be released before the special, but was instead released on October 23, 2012.

References

External links

 
 

Tinker Bell (film series)
DisneyToon Studios animated films
American children's films
Films scored by Joel McNeely
Films set in Scotland
American animated fantasy films
2011 television specials
2011 films
2010s American films